Jaden Shawn Bradley is an American college basketball player for the Alabama Crimson Tide of the Southeastern Conference (SEC).

Early life and high school
Bradley originally grew up in Rochester, New York. His family moved to Charlotte, North Carolina while he was in elementary school and attended the Cannon School in Concord, North Carolina. Bradley named the 2020 North Carolina Gatorade Player of the Year after averaging 23.1 points, 6.4 rebounds, 6.1 assists, and 2.9 steals per game. He transferred to IMG Academy in Bradenton, Florida before the start of his junior year. Bradley averaged 11.4 points and led the team with 4.6 assists and two steals per game in his only season at IMG. He was selected to play in the 2022 McDonald's All-American Boys Game at the end of the season but couldn’t due to injury.

Bradley was rated a five-star recruit. He committed to play college basketball at Alabama after considering an offer from Arizona while listing Gonzaga, Kentucky, and Florida State as finalists.

College career
Bradley entered his freshman season at Alabama as the Crimson Tide's second-string point guard. He became a starter in December after guard Nimari Burnett suffered a wrist injury.

References

External links
Alabama Crimson Tide bio

Living people
African-American basketball players
American men's basketball players
Basketball players from North Carolina
Alabama Crimson Tide men's basketball players
Point guards
Year of birth missing (living people)
McDonald's High School All-Americans